Electric Soul! is the debut album by American saxophonist Buddy Terry recorded in 1967 and released on the Prestige label.

Reception

AllMusic awarded the album 3 stars.

Track listing
All compositions by Buddy Terry except as noted
 "Electric Soul" - 6:50
 "Alfie" (Burt Bacharach, Hal David) - 4:45
 "Hey, Nellie" - 4:35
 "Everything Is Everything" (Whitaker) - 4:35
 "The Ubangi That Got Away" - 7:15
 "Jimmy" (Jay Thompson) - 5:15
 "The Band Bandit" - 6:40

Personnel
Buddy Terry - tenor saxophone, varitone
Jimmy Owens - trumpet, flugelhorn
Harold Mabern - piano
Ron Carter - bass
Freddie Waits - drums

References

Prestige Records albums
Buddy Terry albums
1967 albums
Albums produced by Cal Lampley
Albums recorded at Van Gelder Studio